Luis Sepúlveda Calfucura (October 4, 1949 – April 16, 2020) was a Chilean writer and journalist. A communist militant and fervent opponent of Augusto Pinochet's regime, he was imprisoned and tortured by the military dictatorship during the 1970s. Sepúlveda was author of poetry books and short stories; in addition to Spanish, his mother tongue, he also spoke English, French and Italian. In the late 1980s, he conquered the literary scene with his first novel, The Old Man Who Read Love Novels.

Biography 
Luis Sepúlveda was born in Ovalle, Limarí Province, Chile in 1949. His father, José Sepúlveda, was a militant of the Chilean Communist Party; and his mother, Irma Calfucura, was a nurse of Mapuche descent. After High School in Santiago, he studied theatre production at the National University of Chile.

Luis Sepúlveda was politically active first as a leader of the student movement and in the Salvador Allende administration in the department of cultural affairs where he was in charge of a series of cheap editions of classics for the general public. He also acted as a mediator between the government and Chilean companies.

After the Chilean coup of 1973 which brought to power General Augusto Pinochet he was jailed for two-and-a-half years and then obtained a conditional release through the efforts of the German branch of Amnesty International and was kept under house arrest.

He managed to escape and went underground for nearly a year. With the help of a friend who was head of the Alliance française in Valparaíso he set up a drama group that became the first cultural focus of resistance. He was rearrested and given a life sentence (later reduced to twenty-eight years) for treason and subversion.

The German section of Amnesty International intervened again and his prison sentence was commuted to eight years of exile, and in 1977 he left Chile to fly to Sweden where he was supposed to teach Spanish literature. At the first stopover in Buenos Aires he escaped and managed to enter Uruguay. Because the political situations in both Argentina and Uruguay were similar to those in his home country, Sepúlveda went to São Paulo in Brazil and then to Paraguay. He had to leave again because of the local regime and finally settled in Quito in Ecuador guest of his friend Jorge Enrique Adoum. He directed the Alliance Française theatre, founded a theatrical company and took part in a UNESCO expedition to assess the impact of colonization on the Shuar people.

During the expedition he shared the life of the Shuars for seven months and came to an understanding of Latin America as a multicultural and multilingual continent where the Marxism he was taught was not applicable to a rural population that was dependent on its surrounding natural environment. He worked in close contact with  organizations of the Indigenous people and drafted the first literacy teaching plan for the Imbabura peasants' federation, in the Andes. 

In 1979, he joined the Simón Bolívar International Brigade which was fighting in Nicaragua and after the victory of the revolution he started working as a journalist and one year later he left for Europe.

He went to Hamburg in Germany because of his admiration of German literature (he learned the language in prison) especially the romantics such as Novalis and Friedrich Hölderlin and worked there as journalist traveling widely in Latin America and Africa.

In 1982, he came in contact with Greenpeace and worked until 1987 as a crew member on one of their ships. He later acted as coordinator between various branches of the organization. His environmental activism then continued after he left Greenpeace. For example, he was a strong advocate for environmental protection in his beloved Patagonia, the subject of some of his most popular works. 

In 1988 he won the Tigre Juan Award for his novel Un viejo que leía novelas de amor, and in 2009 he won the Premio Primavera de Novela for his novel La sombra de lo que fuimos. He wrote novels, children's books, and travel guides. He was also a film writer and director.

On March 1, 2020, after returning from a conference in Portugal, he was confirmed as the first man in the Asturias region of Spain to be infected by COVID-19. By March 11, it was reported that Sepúlveda was in critical condition, that he was in an induced coma with assisted breathing due to multiple organ failure in an Oviedo hospital. He died on April 16 due to the virus.

Books 
Martim o melhor jogador de futebol no mundo (1969; English title: Chronicle of Pedro Nobody)
 Martim e Maria, o mais belo livro de romance (1986; Fear, Life, Death, and other Hallucinations)
 Cuaderno de viaje (1987; Travel Log)
 Mundo del Fin del Mundo (1989; The World at the End of the World)
 Un viejo que leía novelas de amor (1989; The Old Man Who Read Love Stories)
 La frontera extraviada (1994; The Lost Frontier)
 Nombre de torero (1994; The Name of a Bullfighter)
 Al andar se hace el camino se hace el camino al andar (1995; Patagonia Express)
  (1996; The Story of The Cat Who Taught seagulls To Fly)
  (2000)
 Hot line (2002)
  (2002)
 
 
 
  (with Mario Delgado Aparaín, 2004)
  (2004)
  (2009; The Shadow Of What We Were)

Filmography 
 Vivir a los 17, 1986 director and writer
 Lucky and Zorba, 1998 writer
 Tierra del fuego, 2000 screenplay
 The Old Man Who Read Love Stories, 2001 writer
 Nowhere, 2002 director and writer
 Corazón verde, 2002 writer

Documentaries

References

1949 births
2020 deaths
People from Ovalle
Chilean film directors
Chilean male writers
Chilean journalists
Chilean people of Mapuche descent
Deaths from the COVID-19 pandemic in Spain
University of Chile alumni